Frank Girard Harrison (February 2, 1940 – June 1, 2009) was a one-term Democratic member of the U.S. House of Representatives from Pennsylvania.

Biography
Harrison was born in Washington, D.C. and grew up in Wilkes-Barre, Pennsylvania. He graduated from his hometown's King's College in 1961, and Harvard Law School in 1964.  Harrison served in the United States Air Force as a captain from 1966 to 1969.  He was a college professor at Trinity University from 1969 to 1982.

Harrison was elected in 1982 as a Democrat to the 98th United States Congress. He was an unsuccessful candidate for renomination in 1984.

He was a visiting scholar in residence at King's College in Wilkes-Barre. He died in Galveston, Texas, aged 69.

References

External links
 Retrieved on 2009-5-19
 

1940 births
2009 deaths
Harvard Law School alumni
People from Galveston, Texas
Politicians from Wilkes-Barre, Pennsylvania
United States Air Force officers
King's College (Pennsylvania) alumni
Democratic Party members of the United States House of Representatives from Pennsylvania
Trinity University (Texas) faculty
20th-century American politicians
Military personnel from Texas
Military personnel from Pennsylvania